Bykovskaya is a rural locality (a village) in Yavengskoye Rural Settlement, Vozhegodsky District, Vologda Oblast, Russia. The population was 20 as of 2002.

Geography 
The distance to Vozhega is 24 km, to Baza is 10 km. Fominskaya, Savinskaya, Pestinskaya are the nearest rural localities.

References 

Rural localities in Vozhegodsky District